Alkaline hydrolysis, in organic chemistry, usually refers to types of nucleophilic substitution reactions in which the attacking nucleophile is a hydroxide ion.

Example 
In the alkaline hydrolysis of esters and amides the hydroxide ion nucleophile attacks the carbonyl carbon in a nucleophilic acyl substitution reaction. This mechanism is supported by isotope labeling experiments. For example, when ethyl propionate with an oxygen-18 labeled ethoxy group is treated with sodium hydroxide (NaOH), the oxygen-18 is completely absent from the sodium propionate product and is found exclusively in the ethanol formed.

Uses 
The reaction is often used to turn solid organic matter into a liquid form for easier disposal. Drain cleaners take advantage of this method to dissolve hair and fat in pipes. The reaction is also used to dispose of human and other animal remains as an alternative to traditional burial or cremation.

See also 
 Acid hydrolysis
 Enzymatic hydrolysis
 Saponification

References 

Chemical reactions
Acid–base chemistry